The Walk is a City Block Films and Aslan Pictures production in cooperation with the Indigenous peoples of California.  It was an official selection of the Sundance Film Festival and was distributed by Rugged Entertainment.

Plot
The Walk tells the story of three hundred Native people that attempted to walk 768 miles, from the Pala Reservation near San Diego to Sacramento, in an effort to bring unification to the tribal nations of California.

California has the largest Native American population in the United States with 278 tribal nations, more than any other state in the country. The history of California Indians is brutal and devastating, but few Americans, including Californians, know anything about these tribes. The Walk tells the moving story of the traditional walk of several California tribal communities and their supporters.  Led by Native spiritual leader, Robert John, and beginning at the Pala reservation in Southern California, the group makes the 768-mile journey to Sacramento, the state's political seat. There they hope to bring light to issues threatening Native American sovereignty, preservation of culture and language, and intertribal unity.

References

External links 
 

2001 films
2001 documentary films
Documentary films about Native Americans
Documentary films about indigenous rights
American documentary films
Films shot in California
Indigenous peoples of California topics
Films set in San Diego
Films set in Sacramento, California
2000s English-language films
2000s American films